Darreh Shur (also Romanized as Darreh Shūr) is a village in Khorram Dasht Rural District, Kamareh District, Khomeyn County, Markazi Province, Iran. At the 2006 census, its population was 58, in 18 families.

References 

Populated places in Khomeyn County